Jon Leif Berle (July 12, 1932 – November 30, 2010) was a Norwegian actor, dancer, and choreographer. He performed in productions at the Norwegian Theater and the Norwegian Opera. He also choreographed My Fair Lady for Opera Week in Kristiansund, and he arranged and translated Carmen for the Vestfold Symphony Orchestra in 1981. In 1990, he was the director of the russ revue Røde rytmer at the Hjertnes Civic and Theater Center in Sandefjord, and he was awarded the title "honorary russ" the same year.

Filmography

 1960: Millionær for en aften as a dancer
 1960: Omringet
 1961: Oss atomforskere i mellom
 1962: Operasjon Løvsprett as a soldier
 1970: Olsenbanden og Dynamitt-Harry as the gangster in shirt sleeves
 1972: Olsenbanden tar gull as the driver
 1974: Ungen as a worker
 1974: Bør Børson Jr. as a ballet dancer
 1975: Olsenbandens siste bedrifter as the bus driver
 1977: Olsenbanden og Dynamitt-Harry på sporet as Mario, a punk
 1982: Carl Gustav, gjengen og parkeringsbandittene as Farris
 1989: Viva Villaveien!

References

External links
 
 Jon Berle at the Swedish Film Database
 Jon Berle at Sceneweb
 Jon Berle at Filmfront

1932 births
2010 deaths
20th-century Norwegian actors
Norwegian male dancers
Norwegian choreographers